"Drive" is a song written and recorded by Canadian country rock artist Cory Marks. It was the second single from Marks' studio album Who I Am. The track was produced by Kevin Churko and Kane Churko.

Background
Marks wrote "Drive" alone, and said it "is one of those summertime, roll down your window good feeling love songs".

Critical reception
"Drive" received generally positive reviews. Dave Brooks of Billboard called the song a "made for country radio jam" and "anthem with a infectious hook and roll-down-your-window feel-good sound", noting inspiration from past country stars like Alan Jackson and Brooks & Dunn. Peter Coates of Think Country Music referred to it as a "top-down, feelgood, summer-cruising, country rocker". Tuonela Magazine wrote that the track is a "feel-good romance about trucks, driving, and love". Bethany Bowman of Main Street Nashville described the song as a "country classic".

Music video
The official music video for "Drive" was directed by Ed Regan and premiered on June 4, 2020. It features Marks and actor/pilot Kristy Mair.

Notes

References

2020 songs
2020 singles
Cory Marks songs
Songs written by Cory Marks
Song recordings produced by Kevin Churko